The men's freestyle 65 kilograms is a competition featured at the 2017 World Wrestling Championships, and was held in Paris, France on 26 August 2017.

This freestyle wrestling competition consisted of a single-elimination tournament, with a repechage used to determine the winners of two bronze medals.

Results
Legend
F — Won by fall

Final

Top half

Bottom half

Repechage

References

External links
Official website

Men's freestyle 65 kg